Kya Aap Paanchvi Pass Se Tez Hain? is a game show hosted by leading Bollywood actor, Shahrukh Khan. It was the Indian version of the popular American game show, Are You Smarter than a 5th Grader?  and was telecast on Indian Television channel STAR Plus. The show premiered on 25 April 2008 and the last episode was telecast on 27 July 2008 with Lalu Prasad Yadav as the special guest.

The Indian series was licensed by Bulldog Media & Entertainment and produced by Shreyash Srivastav

Cheats 
The show used "cheats" based on the American show. Each cheat may be used once per game.
Taak Jhank (peek): the contestant had the opportunity to review his or her current teammate's answer before submitting his or her own
Copy: the contestant could choose to use his or her teammate's answer.
Bachao (save): This cheat was triggered automatically if the contestant gave a wrong answer. If the contestant's current partner had the correct answer, the contestant was then saved.
Cheats are not available for use in the bonus (final) question.

Teammates 
The teammates were five school aged children chosen by the producers of the show.  Each child could be used for assistance on two questions, excluding the bonus question.

The five possible teammates 
Shriya Sharma
Dheirya Sorecha from Mumbai, Maharashtra
Anubhav Motilal from Delhi
Shreeparna Ghoshal from Delhi
Milanjeet Singh Bhatti from Chandigarh
Taruni Sachdev (replaced Shriya for one episode)

Homework questions 
This show also posed homework questions, offering  to a viewer selected by draw who correctly answered a question asked at the end of the show.

Payout structure 

Giving the correct answer to their fifth question guarantees the contestant leaves with at least 2 lakh. The contestant may walk away ("drop out") at any question after the first to end the game and keep their winnings. Only the subject of the final question is shown. This is the contestant's final opportunity to walk away with 1 crore. If they choose to see the final question, they will have to risk 98 lakh and cannot walk away or seek help from teammates.

References

External links 
Big Synergy
Bulldog Media, action $ Entertainment

StarPlus original programming
2008 Indian television series debuts
Indian game shows
Are You Smarter than a 5th Grader?
Indian television series based on American television series